The Ambassador Extraordinary and Plenipotentiary of the Russian Federation to the Republic of Botswana is the official representative of the President and the Government of the Russian Federation to the President and the Government of Botswana.

The ambassador and his staff work at large in the Embassy of Russia in Gaborone.  The post of Russian Ambassador to Botswana is currently held by Andrey Kemarsky, incumbent since 28 October 2020.

History of diplomatic relations

Diplomatic relations between the Soviet Union and Botswana were established on 6 March 1970. Relations were initially handled through the embassy in Zambia, with the Soviet ambassador to Zambia, Dmytro Bilokolos, concurrently accredited to Botswana. The Soviet embassy was opened in Botswana's capital, Gaborone, in August 1976. With the dissolution of the Soviet Union in 1991, the Soviet ambassador, continued as representative of the Russian Federation until 1992.

List of representatives (1970 – present)

Representatives of the Soviet Union to Botswana (1970 – 1991)

Representatives of the Russian Federation to Botswana (1991 – present)

References

 
Botswana
Russia